The 1984 K League Championship was the first competition of the K League Championship, and was held to decide the second champions of the K League. It was contested between winners of two stages of the regular season, and was played over two legs.

Qualified teams

First leg

Second leg

See also
 1984 K League

External links
Official website 
RSSSF

K League Championship
1